Antonio Peña y Goñi  (San Sebastián, 2 November 1846 - Madrid, 13 November 1896), was a Spanish musicologist.

Works

The Spanish opera and dramatic music in Spain in the nineteenth century: historical notes, Madrid, Press of The Liberal, 1881, Madrid, ICCMU, 2004 (Ed. facs.).
Against Spanish opera. Madrid, Manuel G. Hernández, 1885.
Lagartijo and Frascuelo and time, Madrid: Espasa-Calpe, 1994, Valencia, Valencia Booksellers Paris, 2001.
Rienzi. Large tragic opera in five acts. Poetry and music of Richard Wagner. Preceded by the biography of the famous master (Antonio Pena). Madrid: Andres Vidal (son), editor, 1875.
Musings. Madrid: Imp of the VDA. J. Ducazal, 1894.
Guerrita. Madrid: Imp of the widow of J. Ducazal, 1894.
Lagartijo Mexico: Miguel Andres Boots, sa
Horns!: Bulls magazines Madrid Murillo Library, 1883.
From humorous Madrid, 1892.
Four things Hastoy illustrations and Heredia. Madrid, 1895.
Art and Patriotism: Gayarre and Masini Madrid: MG Hernández, 1882
Musical Impressions: collection of critical articles and musical literature Madrid: Manuel de los Rios Minuesa, 1878.
Peña y Goñi et al Iparraguirre and Guernica tree Bilbao, 1896.
Luis Mancinelli and Concert Society Madrid Madrid, 1891 (Typ. Ginés Manuel Hernandez)
Our Musicians: Barbieri Madrid: Jose M. Ducazcal, 1875
The Mastersingers of Nuremberg Wagner Ricardo Madrid, 1893 (Imp José M ª Ducazcal)
Verdi's masterpiece "Aida" musical critical essay. Madrid, 1875 (F. and P. García Iglesias)
The ball and pelotaris Echevarri, Biscay Basque Friends of Books, 1984
Barcelona troubled waters: Antoni López, Editor, Library Spanish, sa
Theatre: Collection of Articles ... Preceded by a biographical and critical study of D. Antonio Peña y Goñi. Barcelona, 1889 (Imp Heinrich and Co.)

1846 births
1946 deaths
Spanish musicologists